Hillary Howard is an American reporter.  She currently co-anchors (along with Shawn Anderson) the 2:00pm to 7:00pm shift on all-news station WTOP in Washington, D.C. Since November 2011, Howard has also served as host of It's Academic.

Career 
Howard began her on-air career as a radio newsperson in suburban New York City. She began her TV news career at WTZA in Kingston, New York where she was a full-time reporter and weatherperson. At WAVY-TV in Portsmouth, Virginia, she was a general assignment reporter and weekend weathercaster. Howard was also hired as a GA reporter/ weathercaster at  WTTG in Washington, D.C. where she eventually became the weekend news anchor and special projects reporter. At WUSA she was the morning weathercaster from 2000–2004. Other work includes voice-over narrations, writing for HGTV, moderating debates and co-producing the 2002 Candlelight Ceremony for the National Fallen Firefighter Memorial in Washington, D.C., honoring those who died in 2001.

Howard previously hosted a news/ interview show on WTWP Radio with Bob Kur. In 2007, "Washington Post Radio" (as WTWP was known on the air) flipped to an all-talk format and Howard (along with Kur) moved to sister station WTOP. Howard also took over hosting the quiz show It's Academic after Mac McGarry, who hosted the show for fifty years, retired in 2011.

Brain surgery 
In November 2010, Howard fell and suffered a head injury. Later, a brain scan revealed a meningioma tumor in Howard's brain. Although the tumor was benign, she opted to have it removed. The surgery was performed at Johns Hopkins Hospital in April 2011. The operation was successful, and she recovered. Howard returned to work in May.

Family 
Howard is married to retired WUSA reporter and noted fire-service blogger Dave Statter.  The couple live in Virginia with their son, Sam.

Awards 
Howard won Emmy Awards for News Writing, Hard News Reporting, Feature Reporting and Weathercasting.  She also won an Imagen Award for reporting on Hispanic Issues, and was a finalist in the New York TV and Film Festivals. Howard also won a Chesapeake AP Award for TV and radio work. Her radio career garnered other awards too including a regional Murrow and SPJ.

References

Year of birth missing (living people)
Living people
American radio personalities
American radio reporters and correspondents
Television anchors from Washington, D.C.